Events in the year 1999 in Japan. It corresponds to the year Heisei 11 in the Japanese calendar.

Incumbents
 Emperor: Akihito
 Prime Minister: Keizo Obuchi (L–Gunma)
 Chief Cabinet Secretary: Hiromu Nonaka (L–Kyōto) until October 5, Mikio Aoki (Councillor, L–Shimane)
 Chief Justice of the Supreme Court: Shigeru Yamaguchi
 President of the House of Representatives: Sōichirō Itō (L–Miyagi)
 President of the House of Councillors: Jūrō Saitō (L–Mie)
 Diet sessions: 145th (regular, January 19 to August 13), 146th (extraordinary, October 29 to December 15)

Governors
Aichi Prefecture: Reiji Suzuki (until 14 February); Masaaki Kanda (starting 15 February)
Akita Prefecture: Sukeshiro Terata 
Aomori Prefecture: Morio Kimura 
Chiba Prefecture: Takeshi Numata 
Ehime Prefecture: Sadayuki Iga (until 27 January); Moriyuki Kato (starting 28 January)
Fukui Prefecture: Yukio Kurita
Fukuoka Prefecture: Wataru Asō 
Fukushima Prefecture: Eisaku Satō
Gifu Prefecture: Taku Kajiwara 
Gunma Prefecture: Hiroyuki Kodera 
Hiroshima Prefecture: Yūzan Fujita 
Hokkaido: Tatsuya Hori
Hyogo Prefecture: Toshitami Kaihara 
Ibaraki Prefecture: Masaru Hashimoto 
Ishikawa Prefecture: Masanori Tanimoto
Iwate Prefecture: Hiroya Masuda 
Kagawa Prefecture: Takeki Manabe 
Kagoshima Prefecture: Tatsurō Suga 
Kanagawa Prefecture: Hiroshi Okazaki 
Kochi Prefecture: Daijiro Hashimoto 
Kumamoto Prefecture: Joji Fukushima 
Kyoto Prefecture: Teiichi Aramaki 
Mie Prefecture: Masayasu Kitagawa 
Miyagi Prefecture: Shirō Asano 
Miyazaki Prefecture: Suketaka Matsukata 
Nagano Prefecture: Gorō Yoshimura 
Nagasaki Prefecture: Genjirō Kaneko 
Nara Prefecture: Yoshiya Kakimoto
Niigata Prefecture: Ikuo Hirayama 
Oita Prefecture: Morihiko Hiramatsu 
Okayama Prefecture: Masahiro Ishii 
Okinawa Prefecture: Keiichi Inamine 
Osaka Prefecture: Knock Yokoyama (until 27 December); Yoshiki Kimura (starting 27 December)
Saga Prefecture: Isamu Imoto 
Saitama Prefecture: Yoshihiko Tsuchiya
Shiga Prefecture: Yoshitsugu Kunimatsu 
Shiname Prefecture: Nobuyoshi Sumita 
Shizuoka Prefecture: Yoshinobu Ishikawa 
Tochigi Prefecture: Fumio Watanabe
Tokushima Prefecture: Toshio Endo 
Tokyo: Yukio Aoshima (until 22 April); Shintarō Ishihara (starting 22 April)
Tottori Prefecture: Yuji Nishio (until 12 April); Yoshihiro Katayama (starting 12 April)
Toyama Prefecture: Yutaka Nakaoki
Wakayama Prefecture: Isamu Nishiguchi 
Yamagata Prefecture: Kazuo Takahashi 
Yamaguchi Prefecture: Sekinari Nii 
Yamanashi Prefecture: Ken Amano

Events
January 1: Telephone numbers in Osaka are extended to ten digits, and mobile phone numbers throughout Japan are extended to eleven.
March 3: The Bank of Japan announces its zero interest rate policy.
April 11: 1999 Tokyo gubernatorial election - Shintaro Ishihara is elected governor of Tokyo.
June 29: Heavy rainfall in Hiroshima Prefecture causes hundreds of landslides and kills 24 people.
July 1: NTT is divided into a holding company, NTT, and three telecom companies, NTT East, NTT West and NTT Communications.
July 23: ANA Flight 61 survives a hijacking attempt and lands safely.
July 31: Rock band Glay gathers about the audiences of 200,000 people at a specially installed pay parking lot of Makuhari Messe in Chiba and hold a Japanese historical concert.
August 9: The Act on National Flag and Anthem is passed.
September 8: Hiroshi Zota randomly attacks passers-by near Ikebukuro Station with a hammer and kitchen knife, killing two and injuring eight.
September 25: According to Japan Fire and Disaster Management Agency confirmed report, Typhoon Bart hit tidal wave occurs in Shiranui, Kumamoto Prefecture, tornado occurs in Toyohashi, Aichi Prefecture, total 31 persons fatalities, with 1,218 person were injures. 
September 29: Yasuaki Uwabe drives a car into Shimonoseki Station and then stabs people, killing five, before being arrested.
September 30: According to Japanese government official confirmed report, JCO Tokaimura nuclear accident occurs in Ibaraki Prefecture, total two workers fatalities.
November 10: Diet of Japan holds its first Question Time.
December 4: Yamagata Shinkansen extension to Shinjō Station opens.

Births
February 3: Kanna Hashimoto, J-Pop singer (Rev. from DVL) and actress
February 7: Tamaki Matsumoto, child actress.
March 12 : Sakura Oda, singer.
April 23 : Sumire Morohoshi, actress.
May 7: Masaki Sato, J-Pop singer.
May 9: Nozomi Ōhashi, child actor and singer.
June 20: Yui Mizuno, singer/dancer (Babymetal).
June 29: Taisei Ota, professional baseball pitcher
July 4: Moa Kikuchi, singer/dancer (Babymetal).
August 8: Sera Azuma, fencer
September 24: Mei Nagano, actress.
October 27: Haruka Kudō, singer.
October 28: Ai Yoshikawa, actress.
November 13: Kotona Hayashi, volleyball player.
December 22: Tomori Kusunoki, voice actress

Deaths
January 31: Shohei Baba, professional wrestler (b. 1938)
February 21: Hideo Itokawa, rocket scientist (b. 1912)
March 11: Kaoru Tada, manga artist (b. 1960)
March 23: Kazue Takahashi, voice actress (b. 1929)
March 27: Hiroyuki Okita, actor (b. 1963)
April 9: Emiko Kado, professional wrestler (b. 1976)
April 13: Masaji Kiyokawa, backstroke swimmer (b. 1913)
April 19: Shijaku Katsura, rakugo performer (b. 1939)
April 29: Denzo Ishizaki, supercentenarian (b. 1886)
May 6: Kaii Higashiyama, painter (b. 1908) 
June 21: Ukyō Kamimura (Kami), musician (b. 1972)
June 24: Kōzō Murashita, singer and songwriter (b. 1953)
July 16: Hiromi Yanagihara, J-pop singer (b. 1979)
July 21: Jun Etō, literary critic (b. 1932)
August 2: Meisei Goto, author (b. 1932)
August 9: Jackie Sato, professional wrestler (b. 1957)
September 16: Utaemon Ichikawa, actor (b. 1907)
September 22
Noriko Awaya, Soprano chanson and ryūkōka singer (b. 1907)
Tomoo Kudaka, football player (b. 1963)
October 3: Akio Morita, businessman and co-founder of Sony Corporation (b. 1921)
October 12 – Ayako Miura, novelist (b. 1922)
October 26: Kazuhito Komatsu, murder victim (b. 1978)
November 1: Minoru Chiaki, actor (b. 1917)
November 3
Shingo Tachi, racing driver (b. 1977)
Keizo Saji, businessman (b. 1919)
November 9 – Yoshinori Yagi, author (b. 1911)
November 29
Kaoru Iwamoto, go player (b. 1902)
Kazuo Sakamaki, naval officer (b. 1918)
December 4: Daishōhō Masami, sumo wrestler (b. 1967)

See also
 1999 in Japanese television
 List of Japanese films of 1999

References

 
Years of the 20th century in Japan
Japan